The Onverwacht Group or Onverwacht Series is a series of greenstone belts and volcanic rock formations from the Archean Eon in the Kaapvaal Craton in South Africa and Eswatini.

A well known part of the Onverwacht Series is visible in the Komati valley, located in the east of the Transvaal region.

Subdivision 
The Onverwacht Group can be divided into two subgroups with six formations:
 Geluk Subgroup
 Swartkoppie Formation - 
 Kromberg Formation - 
 Hooggenoeg Formation - 
 Tjakastad Subgroup
 Komatii Formation - 
 Theespruit Formation - 
 Sandspruit Formation - 

The fossils found in the Onverwacht Series are among the oldest found on Earth.

See also 
 Archean life in the Barberton Greenstone Belt
 Warrawoona Group

References

Bibliography

External links 
 Der Barberton Greenstone Belt und Komatiite

Geologic groups of Africa
Geologic formations of South Africa
Geology of Eswatini
Archean Africa
Fossiliferous stratigraphic units of Africa
Paleontology in South Africa
Origin of life